Alberta Emergency Alert (AEA) is a public warning system in Alberta that warns the public on impending or occurring emergencies affecting an area. The system was implemented in October 2011, replacing the former Alberta Emergency Public Warning System. Alerts are disseminated through various media outlets including television and radio, internet, social media  mobile apps, and cell broadcast.

Alerts are set into two stages; an "Information Alert", in which the public is advised to be prepared for potentially life-threatening emergencies. Information Alerts do not interrupt TV and radio broadcast. A "Critical Alert" in which potentially life-threatening danger is imminent or present such as a tornado touchdown. TV and radio stations in Alberta must transmit "Critical" messages from Alberta Emergency Alert. The system also broadcasts alerts in the event of an AMBER alert.

Unlike the previous system (where the alerts were read on-air by a recorded announcer), alerts are read using a text-to-speech system. Initially, the quality of its voice was criticized, with viewers considering it unclear and prone to mispronouncing the names of locations. In 2013, a new, male voice was implemented, which was programmed to have clearer pronunciations of various terms and place names.

Effective March 31, 2015 for television and radio broadcasters, and April 6, 2018 for LTE wireless networks, carriage of AEA "Critical" messages is mandatory under CRTC rules regarding the implementation of Alert Ready, a national emergency notification system developed by Pelmorex that also uses Common Alerting Protocol. As AEA uses its format and distribution system (besides minor differences in AEA's XML schema for Common Alerting Protocol), the CRTC has considered participation in AEA to sufficiently in compliance with the national alerting mandate. As of March 2023, AEA has been migrated to the national infrastructure.

In 2023, the first biannual alert test took place in March to spread public awareness and prepare the system for the wildfire season, which began that month and typically peaks in May. A technical glitch caused the test alert to be issued nine different times, with the alert issued seven times at 1:55 p.m. MT, and twice more at 2:01 p.m. MT.

References

External links 

Emergency management in Canada
Emergency population warning systems in Canada
2011 establishments in Alberta